Clinical Oncology is a peer-reviewed medical journal covering oncology. It was established in 1989 and is published ten times a year by Elsevier. It is the official journal of the Royal College of Radiologists. The editor-in-chief is Ananya Choudhury. According to the Journal Citation Reports, the journal has a 2015 impact factor of 3.212.

References

External links

Elsevier academic journals
Oncology journals
Publications established in 1989
English-language journals
Academic journals associated with learned and professional societies of the United Kingdom
10 times per year journals